Dustin Troy Duncan is an American public health researcher who is a Professor of Epidemiology and Director of the Spatial Epidemiology Lab at Columbia University. Their research considers how environmental factors influence population health and health disparities. In particular, Duncan has focused on the health of sexual minority men and transgender women of color in New York City and the Deep South.

Early life and education 
Duncan earned their bachelor's degree at Morehouse College. At Morehouse, Duncan majored in psychology. They moved to the Harvard T.H. Chan School of Public Health for their graduate studies, completing a master's degree in public health science. Based at the Dana–Farber Cancer Institute Center for Community-Based Research, Duncan investigated how public perception of safety influenced people's likelihood to walk in urban neighbourhoods. In particular, this appeared to impact ethnic minority and low income adults. Duncan remained at the Harvard T.H. Chan School of Public Health, where they studied environmental influences that cause obesity amongst young people. After earning his doctorate in 2011, Duncan was appointed the Alonzo Smythe Yerby Postdoctoral Fellow at Harvard.

Research and career 
Duncan's research considers how environmental factors influence population health and health disparities. He moved to New York University. In particular, Duncan has focused on the health of sexual minority men and transgender women of color in New York City, Chicago and the Deep South. He is interested in the epidemiology of HIV, sleep and coronavirus diseases. Duncan makes use of Global Positioning System (GPS) technology to better understand neighbourhoods, and they have argued that GPS-defined neighbourhoods are better than ZIP codes for researching communities.

Duncan serves as Director of the Columbia Spatial Epidemiology Lab. Here they lead two cohort studies; N2 (Neighborhoods and Networks), which considers Black, sexual minority men in Chicago and Baton Rouge and TURNNT (Trying to Understand Relationships, Networks and Neighborhoods among Transgender women of colour), which considers HIV-negative transgender women in New York City.

Awards and honors 
 2019 Elected to the Board of Interdisciplinary Association for Population Health Science
 2019 Harvard University T.H. Chan School of Public Health Emerging Award
 2020 Columbia University Irving Medical Center Mentor of the Year Award

Selected publications

Books

Personal life 
Duncan is gay and an ambassador for 500 Queer Scientists.

References 

Living people
Year of birth missing (living people)
Place of birth missing (living people)
Public health researchers
Morehouse College alumni
Columbia University faculty
Harvard School of Public Health alumni
American LGBT scientists
21st-century LGBT people